Michaël N'dri (born 1 November 1984) is a former French professional footballer who played as a striker.

Club career

N'dri played in his youth career for FC Salon de Provence and Val Durance Fa. In 2003, he started his professional career with FC Sète, where he played for two and a half years. He then joined Sporting Toulon Var in January 2006. On 27 June 2007 he signed a two-year contract for R. Charleroi S.C. after scoring 7 goals in 28 games in the 2006/2007 season for Sporting Toulon Var. After one season, on 8 August 2008, he terminated his contract with Sporting Charleroi and signed for Al-Ittihad in the UAE League.

On 5 January 2019, it was announced that N'dri would join Hong Kong Premier League club Lee Man. On 24 May 2020, he re-signed with Lee Man for a further year.

On 28 February 2021, N'dri announced his retirement from professional football.

Honours
Muangthong United
 Thai League 1: 2016
 Thai League Cup: 2016

Lee Man
 Hong Kong Sapling Cup: 2018–19

References

External links

1984 births
Living people
People from Salon-de-Provence
French sportspeople of Ivorian descent
French footballers
French expatriate footballers
French expatriate sportspeople in Hong Kong
Belgian Pro League players
FC Sète 34 players
SC Toulon players
R. Charleroi S.C. players
Dubai CSC players
Al-Ittihad Kalba SC players
Al-Sailiya SC players
Al-Shaab CSC players
Lee Man FC players
Michael N'dri
Michael N'dri
Association football forwards
Expatriate footballers in Belgium
Expatriate footballers in Qatar
Expatriate footballers in the United Arab Emirates
Expatriate footballers in Thailand
Expatriate footballers in Hong Kong
UAE First Division League players
UAE Pro League players
Hong Kong Premier League players
Sportspeople from Bouches-du-Rhône
French expatriate sportspeople in Thailand
French expatriate sportspeople in Belgium
French expatriate sportspeople in Qatar
French expatriate sportspeople in the United Arab Emirates
Footballers from Provence-Alpes-Côte d'Azur